Aleksandr Ladeyshchikov (born August 26, 1979) is a Russian former sprinter. Along with Ruslan Mashchenko, Boris Gorban, and Andrey Semyonov, he won a silver medal in the 4 × 400 m relay at the 2001 IAAF World Indoor Championships, setting a national record for this event.

References

External links 
 
 

1979 births
Living people
Russian male sprinters
World Athletics Indoor Championships medalists
21st-century Russian people